Bradley William Pettitt (born 14 July 1972) is an Australian politician, who was Mayor of Fremantle in Western Australia from 2009 until 2021 and a Fremantle councillor from 2005 to 2009. At the 2021 state election, Pettitt was elected to the Western Australian Legislative Council as the sole member of the Greens Western Australia in the state upper house.

References

1972 births
Living people
Australian Greens members of the Parliament of Western Australia
Members of the Western Australian Legislative Council
Mayors of Fremantle
Western Australian local councillors